This article lists the presidents of Cape Verde, an island country in the Atlantic Ocean off the coast of West Africa, since the establishment of the office of president in 1975. Aristides Pereira was the first person to hold the office, taking effect on 8 July 1975. The incumbent is José Maria Neves, having taken office on 9 November 2021.

List of officeholders
Political parties

Timeline

Latest election

See also

 Cape Verde
 List of prime ministers of Cape Verde
 List of colonial governors of Cape Verde
 Lists of office-holders
 List of current heads of state and government

References

External links
 Official Website 
 World Statesmen – Cape Verde

Government of Cape Verde

Cape Verde
Presidents